Aircoach is an Ireland-based subsidiary company of FirstGroup. It provides airport express coach services from Cork, Belfast, Derry Galway, Greystones, Bray, Southside Dublin and Dublin to Dublin Airport and from Derry to Belfast International Airport.

It also operates car park and stuff shuttles for Dublin Airport and other private hire contracts in the Dublin area, including services for Leinster Rugby and the Football Association of Ireland.

The company will expand it's reach to service Belfast International Airport and Derry / Londonderry from January 2023 following the purchase of fellow transport company Airporter.

History
Aircoach was formed in 1999 by John O'Sullivan, a former Bus Éireann employee. O'Sullivan sold 90% of the company to FirstGroup in 2003 for €15 million before selling the remaining 10% for €1.5 million to FirstGroup in 2005.

Aircoach was awarded the Overall Logistics and Transport Excellence Award at the 2011 Irish Logistics and Transport Awards. The company has also been successful in the Fleet Bus and Coach awards, being named the Irish Inter-City coach operator of the year in 2014 and 2018 and the Airport coach operator of the year in 2020.

In addition to its scheduled services, Aircoach also operates shuttle bus services at Dublin Airport along with contract services and is the Official Coach Supplier to the Leinster Rugby Team and the Football Association of Ireland.

Former Services

The first Aircoach route, the 701 Ballsbridge to Dublin Airport, was suspended after 14 years of operation in April 2013. Many of the stops on this service continue to be served by the 700 Leopardstown route, with the stops unique to the Ballsbridge service being amalgamated into the 702 Greystones and 703 Killiney/Dalkey routes.

A service from Ballinteer to Dublin Airport ran from April 2011 until December 2012, whilst the company also previously ran stopping commuter services to Belfast (2004-2010), Cork (2004-2012) and Portlaoise (2004-2006) to/from Dublin City and Dublin Airport.

The Phoenix Park shuttle ran from May 2008 until January 2010 using East Lancs Myllennium buses which were powered by LPG.

Fleet

The company operates a fleet of 52 Plaxton Panther bodied Volvo B11R coaches built between 2014 and 2020 for its scheduled coach services and 2 Volvo Jonckheere JHV coaches. The coaches are a mixture of 49 seaters with toilets or 53 seaters without toilets.

The Dublin Airport car park shuttle uses 11 articulated Mercedes-Benz Citaro buses, with two 2006 Wright Eclipses bodied Volvo B7RLEs, one 2013 Wright StreetLite and three Plaxton Centro used on staff shuttle duty. The entire bus fleet is due to be replaced with new vehicles in 2023-2024.

See also
 List of bus operators of the United Kingdom

References

External links

 Aircoach Homepage

Bus companies of the Republic of Ireland
Bus operators in Northern Ireland
FirstGroup companies
Transport companies established in 1999
Transport in Ireland
1999 establishments in Ireland